Douglas is a town in Garfield County, Oklahoma, United States. The population was 32 at the 2010 census.

Geography

Climate

Demographics

As of the census of 2000, there were 32 people, 13 households, and 8 families residing in the town. There were 22 housing units at an average density of 145.9 per square mile (56.6/km2). The racial makeup of the town was 100.00% White.

There were 13 households, out of which 46.2% had children under the age of 18 living with them, 53.8% were married couples living together, 7.7% had a female householder with no husband present, and 30.8% were non-families. 15.4% of all households were made up of individuals, and none had someone living alone who was 65 years of age or older. The average household size was 2.46 and the average family size was 2.89.

In the town, the population was spread out, with 28.1% under the age of 18, 6.3% from 18 to 24, 28.1% from 25 to 44, 28.1% from 45 to 64, and 9.4% who were 65 years of age or older. The median age was 38 years. For every 100 females, there were 100.0 males. For every 100 females age 18 and over, there were 91.7 males.

The median income for a household in the town was $19,167, and the median income for a family was $20,000. Males had a median income of $20,625 versus $20,000 for females. The per capita income for the town was $11,141. There were 25.0% of families and 16.2% of the population living below the poverty line, including 37.5% of under eighteens and none of those over 64.

Education
Its school district is Covington-Douglas Schools.

References

External links
 Encyclopedia of Oklahoma History and Culture - Douglas

Towns in Garfield County, Oklahoma
Towns in Oklahoma